Kids vs. Aliens is a 2022 American science fiction horror film directed by Jason Eisener and written by John Davies and Eisener. It is the second spin-off film in the V/H/S franchise and a feature-length adaptation of "Slumber Party Alien Abduction", Eisener's segment from the 2013 anthology horror film V/H/S/2. It stars Dominic Mariche, Phoebe Rex, Calem MacDonald and Asher Grayson.

The film had its world premiere at Fantastic Fest on September 23, 2022, and was released in the United States on January 20, 2023, by RLJE Films and Shudder.

Plot 
A house slumber party turns to terror when bloodthirsty aliens attack, forcing two warring siblings to band together to survive the night.

Cast 
 Dominic Mariche as Gary
 Phoebe Rex as Samantha
 Calem MacDonald as Billy
 Asher Grayson as Jack
 Ben Tector as Miles
 Emma Vickers as Trish
 Isaiah Fortune as Dallas
 Jonathan Torrens as Dad
 Jessica Marie Brown as Mom

Production 
On December 2021, Bloody Disgusting announced Kids vs. Aliens with Jason Eisener directing with John Davies and Eisener writing the screenplay. It was also reported that Dominic Mariche, Calem MacDonald, Phoebe Rex, Asher Grayson, Ben Tector, Emma Vickers and Isaiah Fortune would all star in the film.

Filming
Principal photography on the film began in December 2021 in Nova Scotia.

Release
Kids vs. Aliens premiered at Fantastic Fest on September 23, 2022, and was released by RLJE Films and Shudder on January 20, 2023.

Reception
On review aggregator website Rotten Tomatoes, the film has an approval rating of 56% based on 39 reviews, with an average rating of 5.4/10. The website's critics consensus reads: "Kids vs. Aliens occasionally comes close to offering the goofy fun promised by the title, although the end result is ultimately rather forgettable." On Metacritic, the film has a weighted average score of 51 out of 100, based on 8 critics, indicating "mixed or average reviews".

Future
In September 2022, Eisener stated that there are tentative plans to make more sequels.

References

External links 
 

2022 films
2022 horror thriller films
2022 science fiction films
2020s American films
2020s English-language films
2020s monster movies
2020s science fiction horror films
American horror thriller films
American science fiction horror films
Features based on short films
Film spin-offs
Films shot in Nova Scotia
Shudder (streaming service) original programming
V/H/S (franchise)